Tarhouni is an Arabic surname. Notable people with the surname include:

 Ali Tarhouni (born 1951), Libyan economist and politician
 Nader Al-Tarhouni (born 1979), Libyan footballer

See also
 Talhouni

Arabic-language surnames